Lionel Eric Tapscott (1894 – 1934) was a South African cricketer who played in two Test matches in 1923.

He was born on 18 March 1894 at Kimberley, Cape Colony.

Outside of cricket, Tapscott excelled at tennis and represented South Africa at the 1912 Summer Olympics. He made it all the way to the Round of 16 before losing a five set match to Bohemian Ladislav Žemla-Rázný.

His brother, George, also played Test cricket for South Africa and his sister Billie was a tennis player who reached the quarterfinals at the French Championships and Wimbledon.

He died on 7 July 1934 at Kenilworth, Cape Town.

References

1894 births
1934 deaths
Cricketers from Kimberley, Northern Cape
Cape Colony people
South Africa Test cricketers
South African cricketers
Griqualand West cricketers
South African male tennis players
Olympic tennis players of South Africa
Tennis players at the 1912 Summer Olympics